Venkatanagaram is a village in Rowthulapudi Mandal, Kakinada district in the state of Andhra Pradesh in India.

Geography 

Demographics 
 India census, Venkatanagaram had a population of 124, out of which 67 were male and 57 were female. Population of children below 6 years of age were 16. The literacy rate of the village is 43.52%.

References 

Villages in Rowthulapudi mandal